Agency is the capacity of an actor to act in a given environment. It is independent of the moral dimension, which is called moral agency.

In sociology, an agent is an individual engaging with the social structure. Notably, though, the primacy of social structure vs. individual capacity with regard to persons' actions is debated within sociology. This debate concerns, at least partly, the level of reflexivity an agent may possess.

Agency may either be classified as unconscious, involuntary behavior, or purposeful, goal directed activity (intentional action). An agent typically has some sort of immediate awareness of their physical activity and the goals that the activity is aimed at realizing. In ‘goal directed action’ an agent implements a kind of direct control or guidance over their own behavior.

Human agency

Agency is contrasted to objects reacting to natural forces involving only unthinking deterministic processes. In this respect, agency is subtly distinct from the concept of free will, the philosophical doctrine that our choices are not the product of causal chains, but are significantly free or undetermined. Human agency entails the claim that humans do in fact make decisions and enact them on the world. How humans come to make decisions, by free choice or other processes, is another issue.

The capacity of a human to act as an agent is personal to that human, though considerations of the outcomes flowing from particular acts of human agency for us and others can then be thought to invest a moral component into a given situation wherein an agent has acted, and thus to involve moral agency. If a situation is the consequence of human decision making, persons may be under a duty to apply value judgments to the consequences of their decisions, and held to be responsible for those decisions. Human agency entitles the observer to ask should this have occurred? in a way that would be nonsensical in circumstances lacking human decisions-makers, for example, the impact of comet Shoemaker–Levy on Jupiter.

In philosophy
The philosophical discipline in charge of studying agency is action theory. In certain philosophical traditions (particularly those established by Hegel and Marx), human agency is a collective, historical dynamic, rather than a function arising out of individual behavior. Hegel's Geist and Marx's universal class are idealist and materialist expressions of this idea of humans treated as social beings, organized to act in concert. There is ongoing debate, philosophically derived in part from the works of Hume, between determinism and indeterminacy.

Structure and agency forms an enduring core debate in sociology. Essentially the same as in the Marxist conception, "agency" refers to the capacity of individuals to act independently and to make their own free choices, based on their will, whereas "structure" refers to those factors (such as social class, but also religion, gender, ethnicity, subculture, etc.) that seem to limit or influence the opportunities that individuals have.

In other sciences
Other notions of agency have arisen in the field of economics/management, psychology and social cybernetics:

In economics (contract theory)

Economic agency is an internal instrumentality through which external influences operate mechanistically on action. Internal agency events are a reflection of the impact of external environments from which causal attributes are ignored, and the self-system is simply a repository and conduit for environmental forces.

In psychology

The term of agency used in different fields of psychology with different meaning. It can refer to the ability of recognizing agents or attributing agency to objects based on simple perceptual cues or principles, for instance the principle of rationality, which holds that context-sensitive, goal-directed efficient actions are the crucial characteristics of agents. This topic is thoroughly investigated by developmental and comparative psychologists to understand how an observer is able to differentiate agentive entities from inanimate objects, but it can be also related to the term of autonomous intelligent agency used in cybernetics. Agency can also imply the sense of agency, that is the feeling of being in control.

Emergent interactive agency defines Bandura's view of agencies, where human agency can be exercised through direct personal agency. Bandura formulates his view of agency as a socio-cognitive one, where people are self-organizing, proactive, self-regulating, and engage in self-reflection, and are not just reactive organisms shaped and shepherded by external events. People have the power to influence their own actions to produce certain results. The capacity to exercise control over one’s thought processes, motivation, affect, and action operates through mechanisms of personal agency. Such agencies are emergent and interactive, apply perspectives of social cognition, and make causal contributions to its own motivations and actions using ‘reciprocal causation’.

In social cybernetics

Autonomous agency is able to embrace the concepts of both the economic agency and the emergent interactive agency. An autonomous system is self-directed, operating in, and being influenced by, interactive environments. It usually has its own immanent dynamics that impact on the way it interacts. It is also adaptable and (hence viable thus having a durable existence), proactive, self-organizing, self-regulating and so forth, participates in creating its own behaviour, and contributes to its life circumstances through cognitive and cultural functionality. Autonomous agency may also be concerned with the relationship between two or more agencies in a mutual relationship with each other and their environments, with imperatives for an agency's behaviour within an interactive context due to immanent emergent attributes.

In political economy

Human agency refers to the ability to shape one’s life and a few dimensions can be differentiated. Individual agency is reflected in individual choices and the ability to influence one’s life conditions and chances. The individual agency differs strongly within the society across age, gender, income, education, personal health status, position in social networks, and other dimensions. Collective agency refers to situations in which individuals pool their knowledge, skills, and resources, and act in concert to shape their future. Everyday agency refers to consumer and daily choices, and finally strategic agency refers to the capacity to affect the wider system change. Political economy approaches can be used to conceptualize the agency enabling or limiting rule system, which constitutes the “grammar” for social action and that is used by the actors to structure and regulate their transactions with one another in defined situations or spheres of activity.

See also

 Action theory (philosophy)
 Actor–network theory
 Agency (sociology)
Agency (psychology)
 Sense of agency
 Collective intentionality
 Corporate personhood
 Intentionality
 Nature and nurture
 Social action

References

Further reading
  – Describes the form of agency.
Juarrero, Alicia (1999). Dynamics in Action: Intentional Behavior as a Complex System (MIT Press). Examines agency from the perspective of complexity theory. Reconceptualizes intentional causality in terms of whole-part context-sensitive constraints.

 
 

Action (philosophy)
Free will
Personhood
Sociological theories